Bocage Plantation is a historic plantation in Darrow, Ascension Parish, Louisiana, about  southeast of Baton Rouge. The plantation house was constructed in 1837 in Greek Revival style with Creole influences, especially in the floorplan.  Established in 1801, the plantation was added to the National Register of Historic Places on June 20, 1991.

History
Bocage Plantation was established in January 1801, 5 years after Étienne de Boré proved that sugarcane cultivation could be profitable in southern Louisiana and 2 years before the Louisiana Purchase. It was a wedding gift from St. James Parish planter Marius Pons Bringier to his eldest daughter, 14-year-old Francoise "Fanny" Bringier, on the occasion of her marriage to 34-year-old Parisian bon vivant Christophe Colomb.

The original house, built in 1801 and destroyed by fire in or before 1837, was a "raised Creole house—brick on the first floor supporting a heavy-timber frame above". At first, it was thought that this house was at the same site as, and the basis for, the current house, until, "during the process [of the 2008 restoration], the bases of four symmetrically placed chimneys[,] surrounded by charred remains and fragments of brick and broken glass (the glass dating to 1800), were discovered buried about 40 feet behind the [current] house."

Although sources vary as to the certainty of it, the design of the current, 1837, house has been attributed to James H. Dakin, who came to Louisiana in 1835, was employed by the Bringier family, and was skilled in Greek Revival architecture. Distinctive features of the façade include the massive entablature, with pediment design on the parapet and denticulated cornice, supported across the entire front by square, giant order columns forming a double gallery. The front staircase did not always exist. It was re-added during the 2008 restoration, based on the oldest known picture/watercolor painting of Bocage done at the beginning of the 20th century. The upper gallery was used to film a scene in the movie "Twelve Years a Slave". The upper gallery opens into a large double parlor on the premier étage, where rooms open into each other, without halls, in the Creole style, with a cabinet-loggia at the rear. Giant twelve-feet-tall sliding doors separate the upper parlors when closed. The roof once served as a rainwater catch basin, with the fresh water shunted through pipes to a cistern on each side, in back of the house.

After many years of neglect, the house was restored in 1941 by Drs. E. G. Kohlsdorf and Anita Crozat (Mrs. Kohlsdorf). An auction in 2007 sold various furnishings from the house and grounds. In 2008 the house—having been further restored by its new owner, Dr. Marion Rundell—became a B&B that also offered public tours.

Geography
Bocage Plantation is located on Louisiana Highway 942, along the River Road, in Darrow, Ascension Parish, on the east bank of the Mississippi River, but on a meander that puts it north and west of the river. The plantation is across the river from the parish seat of Donaldsonville, and about 25 miles southeast of Baton Rouge.

Filming location
Bocage Plantation was used as a setting for "Shaw Farm" in the 2013 film 12 Years a Slave.

See also
National Register of Historic Places listings in Ascension Parish, Louisiana

Notes

References

Further reading

External links
Official Website

Houses on the National Register of Historic Places in Louisiana
Sugar plantations in Louisiana
Houses in Ascension Parish, Louisiana
Houses completed in 1837
Greek Revival houses in Louisiana
Creole architecture in Louisiana
Plantation houses in Louisiana
National Register of Historic Places in Ascension Parish, Louisiana